The Habitat Schools Group is a private group of schools, with three schools situated in different areas of Ajman in the United Arab Emirates. It is the school that introduced the concept of Budget schooling in the northern emirates.

Overview
The first school of the group International Indian school was established in 2002, and by 2014, the second school Habitat School, Al Jurf was established with a new concept of schooling by merging the possibilities of space, pedagogy, and technology.

One of the strengths of expatriate education is the cultural variety and linguistic plurality. Habitat schools’ welcoming community is a space where different people from different continents and backgrounds come together with a common mission at heart: “Sharing and Caring for humanity”.

As the schools, which introduced budget schooling in northern emirates, the mission was to make quality education accessible to all students, regardless of their cultural and financial status. For many expatriate students, school is the only space of socialization and it is the place where the majority of their life is spent.

The campuses are designed for students to explore a wide range of experiences, ranging from farming to computer coding. With more than 2000+ trees in the campuses, the students have a green-calm environment for their studies. There is also an organic farm with a greenhouse where students learn about plants and farming.

The schools aim to introduce recent educational practices, for students to experience the basics of various domains during their school days. This has subsequently made the school group ‘The first in the UAE’ in many areas, from farming to an Artificial Intelligence Lab. The schools emphasise instilling the students with a sense of social responsibility and compassion for others and the wider living world. There are 46 nationalities and many cultures in the schools.

The schools under Habitat Schools Group are:

International Indian School, Al Jurf which was established in 2002.
Habitat School, Al Jurf was established in 2014.
Habitat School, Al Tallah which was established in 2014.

Curriculum
Habitat Schools follows the CBSE curriculum. The school follows the guidelines and the vision of the UAE Ministry of Education and the guidelines on curriculum as per the vision of the National Curriculum Framework [NCF] 2005. Through education, the schools aim to nurture the next generation of global citizens by recognizing their skills and facilitating their development. In Habitat schools, students are part of a global community that values and respects diversity. There are six-second language options: Arabic, Hindi, Urdu, Tamil, French, Malayalam and Bangla. Day boarding services are also offered.

Features
The schools feature the following.

Academic and Co-Curricular Focus
 Exceptional performance in CBSE Board Exams in the past years.
 Consistent mentoring of students through various academic support programmes and constant feedback for ensuring optimal learning.
 Stellar student achievements across grades in coding initiatives and competitions.
Advanced & Responsive Learning platforms
 Advanced Learning Management System (LMS) enables students to access learning resources. It includes personalized learning resources, assessments, live class help, and student monitoring.
 Staff and parents access the NOS UK online learning platform to guarantee students are educated safely online.
Learning Innovations and Initiatives
 Data-Driven Schooling – Using LMS data to improve student performance.
 In 2020, the launch of the first Artificial Intelligence lab & introduction of aspects of AI curriculum from elementary grades.
 Values-based programmes like Wings, Habitat for Hope, Habitat for Tomorrow, and innovative summer assignments.

Facilities
The schools have the following facilities:

 Football ground
 Swimming Pool
 Cyber Square
 Basketball Court
 Play areas for Kingergarten and Grades
 Badminton Court
 Volleyball Court
 Farming area for Students and Parents
 Indoor Court
 Auditorium with LED Screen
 Language Labs
 Music, Dance, Yoga and Karate Training
 Special Facilities for Students of Determination

After School’ Learn On’ programme

After-school day boarding facilities as a part of the ‘Learn On’ include the following activities: Football, Swimming, Cyber Square, Basketball, Badminton, Volleyball, Music, Dance, Yoga, Karate.

The centrepiece of the School complex is the Cybersquare. including: Digital Classrooms, Library, Organic Farming, Community Spaces, Indoor & Outdoor Play Area, Mentoring.

References

2002 establishments in the United Arab Emirates
Educational institutions established in 2002
Schools in the Emirate of Ajman
Organisations based in the Emirate of Ajman